Michelle D. Gavin (born 1973) is a senior fellow for Africa Studies at the Council on Foreign Relations. She was the managing director of The Africa Center and from 2011 to 2014, she was the United States Ambassador to Botswana, and served concurrently as the United States representative to the Southern African Development Community (SADC).  She has also worked as a special assistant to President Barack Obama and as a senior director for Africa on the National Security Council.

While Ambassador, “the United States and Botswana launched the most ambitious HIV prevention study in the world, Botswana hosted the 1,400-strong joint military exercise Southern Accord, and the U.S. embassy helped to found the first Botswana-American Chamber of Commerce.”

Gavin was a Rhodes Scholar at Lincoln College, Oxford and received an MPhil in international relations and earned her BA from Georgetown University's Walsh School of Foreign Service, where she was a Truman Scholar.

References

1973 births
Alumni of Lincoln College, Oxford
Ambassadors of the United States to Botswana
American women ambassadors
American Rhodes Scholars
Living people
Directors of museums in the United States
Obama administration personnel
Walsh School of Foreign Service alumni
21st-century American women